Majid Reza Simkhah Asil (born 1 February 1970) is an Iranian wrestler.

References
  Profile

1970 births
Wrestlers at the 1988 Summer Olympics
Wrestlers at the 1992 Summer Olympics
Iranian male sport wrestlers
Living people
Olympic wrestlers of Iran
Asian Games silver medalists for Iran
Asian Games bronze medalists for Iran
Asian Games medalists in wrestling
Wrestlers at the 1990 Asian Games
Wrestlers at the 1994 Asian Games
World Wrestling Championships medalists
Medalists at the 1990 Asian Games
Medalists at the 1994 Asian Games
People from Nowshahr
Sportspeople from Mazandaran province
20th-century Iranian people
21st-century Iranian people